San José Volcano is the stratovolcano that gives its name to a massive volcanic group, at about  from Santiago de Chile at the end of the Cajón del Maipo on the Chile-Argentina border. It lies on the south end of an approximately  x  complex that includes the La Engorda, Espiritu Santo, Plantat and Marmolejo volcanoes, the latter of which is located on the Northern end of the group.

See also 

 List of volcanoes in Argentina
 List of volcanoes in Chile

References 
 
  (in Spanish; also includes volcanoes of Argentina, Bolivia, and Peru)
 

Volcanoes of Santiago Metropolitan Region
Mountains of Santiago Metropolitan Region
Mountains of Mendoza Province
Volcanoes of Mendoza Province
Active volcanoes
Polygenetic volcanoes
Principal Cordillera
Stratovolcanoes of Argentina
Stratovolcanoes of Chile